Eta Indi, Latinised from η Indi, is a single, white-hued star in the southern constellation Indus. It is a faint star but visible to the naked eye with an apparent visual magnitude of 4.52. 

Measurements with the Hipparcos spacecraft showed the star, which is single, appears to move against the deep sky backdrop by a mean biannual parallax shift of around 41.37 mas, which equates to 79 light-years' distance. Its radial vector to our system's own trajectory (radial velocity) shows it to be in a phase of a narrowing of the gap, at a rounded −2 km/s, net. η Indi appears to be a member of the Octans association, a group of 62 stars that are around 30−50 million years old and have common motion.

The spectrum of this star matches a stellar classification of A9 IV which suggests it is an evolving subgiant star of type A. The star is estimated 1.6  (masses of the Sun), and 2.27  (its radius). The star is spinning with a projected rotational velocity of 75 km/s. It is very likely to be a hybrid Delta Scuti/Gamma Doradus variable.

References

A-type subgiants
Indus (constellation)
Indi, Eta
Durchmusterung objects
197157
102333
7920